Kalkar ( is a municipality in the district of Kleve, in North Rhine-Westphalia, Germany. It is located near the Rhine, approx. 10 km south-east of Cleves. The catholic church St. Nicolai has preserved one of the most significant sacral inventories from the late Middle Ages in Germany.

History

Kalkar was founded by Dirk VI of Cleves in 1230 and received city rights in 1242. It was one of the seven "capitals" of Cleves (called Kleve), until the line of the Duchy of Cleves died out in 1609, whereupon the city went over to the Margraviate of Brandenburg. Marie of Burgundy, Duchess of Cleves retired to Monreberg castle in Kalkar, where she founded a Dominican convent in 1455. Under her influence the city bloomed and artists were attracted to the favorable climate for cultural investment. She died at Monreberg castle in 1463.

Air base
The USAF 470TH Air Base Squadron supports the NATO Joint Air Power Competence Center (JAPCC) in Kalkar and the NATO CAOC in Uedem. The 470th is not located in Kalkar however.

Nuclear reactor

Between 1957 and 1991, West Germany, Belgium and the Netherlands pursued an ambitious plan for a fast breeder nuclear reactor, the a  prototype reactor, SNR-300, near Kalkar.  Construction of the SNR-300 began in April 1973.  In the wake of large anti-nuclear protests at Wyhl and Brokdorf, demonstrations against the SNR-300 reactor escalated in the mid-1970s.  A large demonstration in September 1977 involved a "massive police operation that included the complete closure of autobahns in northern Germany and identity checks of almost 150,000 people".

Construction of the Kalkar reactor was completed in the middle of 1985, but a new state government was clearly against the project, and opposition mounted following the Chernobyl disaster in April 1986.  In March 1991, the German federal government said that the SNR-300 would not be put into operation; the project costs, originally estimated at $150 to $200 million, escalated to a final cost of about $4 billion (equivalent to about $B in ).

The nuclear reactor plant has since been turned into Kern-Wasser Wunderland, an amusement park with a rollercoaster and several other rides and restaurants.

Novel
In the science fiction novel "The Moon Maid", Edgar Rice Burroughs used "Kalkars" as the name for a malevolent fictional race living on the  Moon and later invading Earth.

Gallery

References

Populated places on the Rhine
Anti–nuclear power movement
Anti-nuclear movement in Germany
Kleve (district)